A station group may refer to:

Station group (railway), to or from which a common ticket may be issued, allowing arrival at one station and departure from another within the group 
duopoly (broadcasting), also called a station group, particularly for radio stations under common ownership in the same community in the United States
twinstick, also called a station group, particularly for television stations under common ownership in the same community in Canada